Starcom may refer to:
Space Training and Readiness Command, field command of the United States Space Force
Starcom: The U.S. Space Force, a 1980s animated TV show
Starcom (media agency), a media planning company that is part of Publicis Groupe
Starcom IP Asia, the digital marketing segment
Starcom Network, a radio station in Barbados
UTStarcom, a networking products company